Facundo Lugones (born 6 July 1992) is an Argentine tennis coach. He has been a coach since 2015, and has worked full-time with Cameron Norrie since 2017, helping him reach a career-high ranking of World No. 8. Lugones and Norrie met while at Texas Christian University; they were teammates on the Horned Frogs, the university's tennis team, in Lugones' final year.

Lugones was chosen by his peers as Coach of the Year in the 2021 ATP Awards.

As a player, Lugones lost to Paul Capdeville in the qualifying first round at the 2011 Argentina Open, in his only appearance in an ATP (main or qualifying) draw.

Former professional tennis player Christian Miniussi is his uncle.

References

External links
Facundo Lugones ATP coach profile

Argentine tennis coaches
1992 births
Living people
People from Adrogué
Sportspeople from Buenos Aires Province